Elachista amparoae is a moth of the family Elachistidae. It is found in Spain and France.

References

amparoae
Moths described in 1992
Moths of Europe